Neckar-Odenwald-Kreis is a Landkreis (district) in the north of Baden-Württemberg, Germany. Neighboring districts are (from east clockwise) Main-Tauber-Kreis, Hohenlohe-Kreis, Heilbronn, Rhein-Neckar-Kreis, Odenwaldkreis (Hesse) and Landkreis Miltenberg (Bavaria). The district is part of the Rhine-Neckar Metropolitan Region.

History
The district was created in 1973 by merging the previous districts Buchen and Mosbach. At first it was named Odenwaldkreis, however to avoid confusion with the neighboring district in Hesse with the same name it was renamed in 1974 to be Neckar-Odenwald-Kreis.

Geography
As the name already suggests the district is located in the Odenwald mountains, with the highest elevation at the  Katzenbuckel (626 m) near Waldbrunn in the west of the district. The main river of the district is the Neckar.

Coat of arms
The district's coat of arms might be described thus: Per pale dexter bendy lozengy argent and azure, sinister gules a wheel spoked of six argent. The coat of arms shows the symbols of the two historical rulers of the district. On the dexter (armsbearer’s right, viewer’s left) side is the blue and white "bendy lozengy" (that is, slanted diamond shapes) of the Wittelsbach family as owners of the Electorate of the Palatinate; on the sinister (armsbearer’s left, viewer’s right) side is the Wheel of Mainz, a symbol of the old Electorate of Mainz.

Municipalities

References

External links

 Official website (German)

 
Karlsruhe (region)
Districts of Baden-Württemberg